Schneier is a surname. Notable people with the surname include:
 Arthur Schneier (born 1930), Austrian-American rabbi and human rights activist
 Bruce Schneier (born 1963), American cryptographer, computer security specialist, and writer
 Marc Schneier (born 1959), American rabbi

See also 
 Schneer